L'Illustré is a French language weekly consumer magazine published in Lausanne, Switzerland. It is one of the earliest magazines published in the country and has been in circulation since 1921.

History and profile
L'Illustré was first published in Romandie on 10 September 1921. The magazine was printed and published in Zofingen. During its initial phase, it covered French translations of the articles published in the Swiss German magazine SIZ. Over time it had its own editorial profile, leaving its German focus.

L'Illustré is part of the Ringier AG and is based in Lausanne. The magazine is published on a  weekly basis by L'illustré publishing. As of 2012 Michel Jeanneret was the editor-in-chief. In December 2014 Ringier AG and Axel Springer SE reported that they would establish a new joint venture under the name of Ringier Axel Springer Medien Schweiz and that L'Illustré would be part of this company among the other publications.

L'Illustré is a popular magazine, and covers both celebrity portraits and ideas for the families. In April 2010 the magazine was redesigned. Its coverage expanded to include sections about travel, fashion, beauty, wellness and food in addition to those on celebrities, current events, cars and decoration among the others.

Circulation
Between July 2004 and June 2005 L'Illustré sold 108,798 copies. The circulation of the magazine was 106,144 copies between July 2005 and June 2006 and 104,279 copies between July 2006 and June 2007. Its circulation became 99,547 copies between July 2007 and June 2008. L'Illustré sold 76,697 copies in 2014, and its readership was 338,000 in the second half of 2014.

See also
 List of magazines in Switzerland

References

External links

1921 establishments in Switzerland
French-language magazines
Magazines established in 1921
Women's magazines published in Switzerland
Mass media in Lausanne
Weekly magazines published in Switzerland